Trebinjë is a village and a former municipality in the Korçë County, southeastern Albania. At the 2015 local government reform it became a subdivision of the municipality Pogradec. The population at the 2011 census was 2,481. The municipal unit consists of the villages Trebinjë, Çezmë e Madhe, Çezmë e Vogël, Hondisht, Selcë e Sipërme, Llëngë, Plenisht, Hoshtecë, Zemcë, Potgozhan, Malinë, Kalivaç, Pevelan, Dunicë and Guri i Bardhë.

References

Former municipalities in Korçë County
Administrative units of Pogradec
Villages in Korçë County